Steffan Luke Aquarone is a UK entrepreneur in the film and technology sectors. His projects involve collaboration between large groups of people with a common interest and are often crowd-source financed, the most notable example being feature-film Tortoise in Love which was made by a village in Oxfordshire.

In 2014, Aquarone was named by the Daily Mirror as one of the Top 20 most influential media figures under 30.

Education
Born and raised in Blickling, Aquarone was educated at home as a member of Education Otherwise until the age of 12, before attending Norwich School. He then read Politics and International Relations at the University of Warwick, graduating with a BA in 2006.

Business
In 2004, Aquarone co-founded media business Ephex Media Limited with two fellow students at the University of Warwick. Ephex Media received investment from the Advantage Early Growth Fund in 2007 in order to acquire regional post-production facility Oakslade Studios. The company made and edited corporate films for brands including Land Rover, Vodafone, Massey Ferguson and American Express. The business was placed into administration in 2008.

Aquarone co-owns feature film production company Immense Productions with author Guy Browning, whose first feature Tortoise in Love on which Aquarone was producer released in the UK in 2012.

In 2011, Aquarone co-founded peer-to-peer mobile payments platform Droplet.

In 2013, Droplet was named among the 'Top 25 UK Startups' by influential technology blog Mashable.

Writing
Aquarone writes on digital marketing topics including online video. In 2012 he wrote "Online Video: A Best Practice Guide" for digital publishers Econsultancy.

In 2017, with his sister Freya, he published "Fourth to First: How to win a local election in under six months". It recounts how he won a council ward for the Liberal Democrats at his first attempt, even though the party finished fourth in the previous contest for the ward.

Politics
On 4 May 2017, he was elected as county councillor for the Melton Constable division of Norfolk County Council. He was elected deputy leader of the Liberal Democrat group on the council.

He stood in the 2019 General Election in the seat of Mid Norfolk finishing third.

In April 2020 he replaced Ed Maxfield as group leader.

In September 2022, the Liberal Democrats picked him to fight the parliamentary seat of North Norfolk in the next general election.

References

Living people
Year of birth missing (living people)
Liberal Democrats (UK) councillors
British businesspeople
Members of Norfolk County Council
People educated at Norwich School
People from Blickling
Politicians from Norwich